Gonepteryx amintha is a butterfly of the family Pieridae. It is found in the   East Palearctic.

Subspecies
G. a. amintha
G. a. formosana (Fruhstorfer, 1908) (Taiwan)
G. a. limonia Mell, 1943 (South Ussuri, Yunnan)
G. a. meiyuanus Murayama & Shimonoya, 1963 (Taiwan)
G. a. murayamae Nekrutenko, 1973 (Yunnan, Sichuan)
G. a. thibetana Nekrutenko, 1968 (south-eastern Tibet)

References
Funet

Butterflies described in 1871
Gonepteryx
Butterflies of Asia
Taxa named by Émile Blanchard